Postcodes were introduced in the Isle of Man in 1993, with the island becoming the IM postcode area. Each town or area is associated with one or more postal districts, assigned by Isle of Man Post Office. Outside the larger towns, the postal districts are further broken down and each postal sector is assigned to a number of villages and settlements.

Coverage
The approximate coverage of the postal districts (and sectors, where relevant) is as follows. In each case the post town is "ISLE OF MAN". The "coverage" column includes the next digit of the post code (the sector).

See also
Postcode Address File
List of postcode areas in the United Kingdom

References

External links
Royal Mail's Postcode Address File
A quick introduction to Royal Mail's Postcode Address File (PAF)

Postcode Area IM
Postcodes Area IM
Postcode areas covering the Crown Dependencies